Jan Rabson (June 14, 1954 – October 13, 2022) was an American actor.

Life and career
Rabson was born in East Meadow, New York, on June 14, 1954. Jan's voice has been heard on thousands of commercials, films, TV shows, and animated films and series. For many years, Jan was a member of Johnny Carson's "Mighty Carson Art Players", performing in on-camera sketches as well as providing the voices for answering machines, cash registers and other inanimate objects for Johnny's sketches. One of his more famous roles included providing the voice for Larry Laffer in Leisure Suit Larry 6: Shape Up or Slip Out!, Leisure Suit Larry: Love for Sail!, Leisure Suit Larry's Casino, Leisure Suit Larry: Magna Cum Laude, Leisure Suit Larry: Reloaded and Leisure Suit Larry: Wet Dreams Don't Dry. Most recently, Jan's voice can be heard in all of the Pixar Cars Toons shorts as well as Toy Story 3, Up, WALL-E and many more. In some of his anime dubbing and on-camera work, he used the name Stanley Gurd, Jr., and is best known for voicing Tetsuo Shima from Akira (the Streamline dub for Orion Pictures) under that name. He is also the voice of Horse from the preschool series Slim Pig.

In 1988, Rabson was the first contestant and champion on Blackout.

In 2013, he reprised his role of Tetsuo Shima for AficionadosChris' review of Akira.

Personal life and death
Rabson resided in Salt Spring Island, British Columbia, Canada and divided work between Vancouver and Los Angeles productions. He died of a heart attack on October 13, 2022, at the age of 68.

Partial filmography

 Unico (1981) – Gods (English version, voice, uncredited)
 Mobile Suit Gundam (1981) – (English version, voice, as Stanley Gurd Jr.)
 Chasing Dreams (1982) – Scout
 Knight Rider (1982) – Charlie, 1 episode
 The Facts of Life (1982) – Waiter, 1 episode
 One Day at a Time (1982) – Charlie, 1 episode
 Kurasshâ Jô (1983) – Talos / Valentine / Cpt. Kowalsky / Nelo / Joe's Father / Smuggler 1 / Smuggler 3 / Smuggler 4 / Smuggler 6 (Enoki Films dub) (voice)
 Uniko: Mahô no shima e (1983) – Lord Kuruku / Melvin's Lackey 1 (English version, voice, uncredited)
 Cheers (1983) – Director, 1 episode
 Katy Caterpillar (1984) – City Rat (English version, voice)
 Hunter (1985) – Reporter, 1 episode
 Vamp (1986) – (voice)
 What's Happening Now!! (1986) – Murray, 1 episode
 The Adventures of Scamper the Penguin (1987) – Mr. Feather / Scientist / Captain / Jack / Various Sailors / Various Male Penguins (voice, uncredited) 
 The Wings of Honneamise (1987) – Dormuhot (English version, voice)
 Jaws: The Revenge (1987) – (voice)
 Fatal Attraction (1987) – Party guest #13
 G-Force: Guardians of Space (1987, TV Series) – Hoot Owl (Hooty) / Dr. Brighthead / Computer
 Night Court (1987-1990) – Laughton / Mr. Borelli, 2 episodes
 Akira (1988, Streamline Pictures English dub) – Tetsuo Shima / Eiichi Watanabe / clowns / cops / others (voice)
 Designing Women (1989) – Man #2, 1 episode
 Just the Ten of Us (1989) – Rod Serling lookalike, 1 episode
 Growing Pains (1990) – Rod Serling, 1 episode
 Where's Waldo? (1991, TV Series) – (voice)
 James Bond Jr. (1991, TV Series) – Gordon 'Gordo' Leiter / Goldfinger / Jaws / Skullcap / The Worm / Snuffer (voice)
 Teenage Mutant Ninja Turtles (1991-1993, TV Series) – Kerma (voice), 4 episodes
 Parker Lewis Can't Lose (1991) – Future Jerry, 1 episode
 Leisure Suit Larry 6: Shape Up or Slip Out! (1993) – Larry Laffer
 Toy Story (1995) – Mr. Mike / Gas Station Attendant (voice)
 Theodore Rex (1995) – Tina Rex (voice)
 Black Jack: The Movie (1996) – Son (English version, voice)
 The Hunchback of Notre Dame (1996) – Frollo's Soldiers (voice)
 Babylon 5 (1996) – Vendor, 1 episode
 Baywatch (1996) – Frank, 1 episode
 Leisure Suit Larry: Love for Sail! (1996) – Larry Laffer
 Hercules (1997) – Driver (voice)
 Pinky and the Brain (1997, TV Series) – Farmer / Referee (voice), 2 episodes
 Almost Perfect (1997) – Man in Line, 1 episode
 A Bug's Life (1998) – Axel / Grasshopper (voice)
 Leisure Suit Larry's Casino (1998) – Larry Laffer
 Toy Story 2 (1999) – Japanese businessman (voice)
 Beverly Hills, 90210 (1999) – Sal, 1 episode
 Monsters, Inc. (2001) – Sushi Chef (voice)
 Justice League (2002, TV Series) – Professor Elrich (voice), 1 episode
 Rugrats (2002, TV Series) – Steve Malone / Weatherman (voice), 1 episode
 Finding Nemo (2003) – Seagulls (voice)
 Leisure Suit Larry: Magna Cum Laude (2004) – Larry Laffer
 Cars (2006) – T.J. Hummer (voice)
 Ice Age: The Meltdown (2006) – Various Mammals (voice)
 Happily N'Ever After (2006) – Additional Voices (voice)
 Surf's Up (2007) – Additional Voices (voice)
 Bratz: Super Babyz (2007) – Tuber (voice)
 Horton Hears a Who! (2008) – Town Cryer (voice)
 WALL-E (2008) – Axiom Passenger #11 (voice)
 Ponyo (2008) – Additional Voices (English version, voice)
 Up (2009) – Construction Worker / TV Announcer (voice)
 Cloudy with a Chance of Meatballs (2009) – Additional Voices (voice)
 Toy Story 3 (2010) – Sparks (voice)
 Quest for Zhu (2011) – Zhu Fu / Mangawanga (voice)
 Superbook (2011–2022) – Professor Quantum / various roles (voice), 25 episodes
 My Little Pony: Friendship Is Magic (2012-2015, TV Series) – Mulia Mild / Wind Rider (voice), 2 episodes
 Monsters University (2013) – Astronomy Club President (voice)
 Despicable Me 2 (2013) – Additional Voices (voice)
 Leisure Suit Larry: Reloaded (2013) – Larry Laffer / Short Man (voice)
 Minions (2015) – Additional Voices (voice)
 Despicable Me 3 (2017) – Additional Voices (voice)
 Leisure Suit Larry: Wet Dreams Don't Dry (2018) – Larry Laffer (voice)
 Leisure Suit Larry: Wet Dreams Dry Twice (2020) – Larry Laffer (voice)

References

External links
Official website

1954 births
2022 deaths
American expatriate male actors in Canada
American male video game actors
American male voice actors
Male actors from New York (state)
People from East Meadow, New York
20th-century American male actors
21st-century American male actors